Colonel Ferdinand Marcelino is an active Marine officer of the Philippine Navy, a graduate of the Philippine Military Academy, class of 1994. Born in Hagonoy, Bulacan, he is the eleventh of 13 children of a fisherman and an ordinary housewife. He managed to finish his primary education with flying colors having graduated as valedictorian and was a consistent scholar in his secondary education. Finishing his college education was really difficult due to poverty which constrained him to take various odd jobs to support himself.

More than just military achievements, Colonel Marcelino transcended the stereotypical role of a soldier in his various assignments, particularly with his work with foreign governments. A number of people who heard Marcelino’s struggle to liberate communities from terrorism and the drug menace described him as brave, credible, and “dead”. “Dead” describes the numerous threats that he gets from the criminals whom he sent to jail, who will do everything to destroy, if not kill him. But, Marcelino is a living inspiration to our people to be upright and honest. He is convinced that “we can change the Philippines for the better, one Filipino at a time, and one government agency at a time, and I will start it from myself”. Indeed, Colonel Marcelino’s life story is one of dedication to the service of the country and its people.

Early Struggle 
Marcelino initially planned to enroll at Pamantasan ng Lungsod ng Maynila believing that it is the only school that his family could afford. But, upon enrolling, he found out that the registration fee amounted to P180.00 – money that they did not have. Determined to finish his studies, Marcelino worked at a construction site at the University of the East in Recto, Manila where he saw a poster of the DAWN, the college’s publication. Immediately, he applied to become one of its staff writers, which helped him pay his tuition. He also became a police beat reporter for the then internationally circulated tabloid, Headline Manila. “Mars”, as his peers call him, was just 16 years old then.

Military career 
As a police reporter and news editor of The Shield (the official publication of UE Citizen Military Training), Marcelino was supposed to interview a high-ranking military officer, when somebody handed him an application for the Philippine Military Academy (PMA) examination. He was finally hard up, so he applied to be a PMA cadet. In PMA, he was one of the editors of The Corps Board and Staff, the official publication of the Cadet Corps and also the managing editor of The Sword, the Academy’s annual publication for the graduating class. After graduating in March 1994, he joined the Philippine Marine Corps and was deployed in Mindanao wherein he spent most of his tour of duty. From being a Platoon Commander in the farthest and war-torn areas in Mindanao, he rose to become a Marine Company Commander, Battalion Staff Officer, Marine Corps Spokesperson, Flag Secretary to the Marine Corps Commandant, and assumed other critical positions in the armed forces of the Philippine hierarchy.

Young Marcelino 
Marcelino was a young lieutenant assigned as Intelligence Officer of Marine Battalion Landing Team-5 who personally led the troops that arrested terrorists and recovered the speedboat in Mapun Island, Tawi-Tawi, which was used by the Abu Sayyaf, led by Commander Aldam Tilao alias Abu Sabaya in the infamous Dos Palmas kidnapping incident. Sabaya was the Abu Sayyaf leader responsible for the kidnapping and killing of innocent Filipinos and foreigners, particularly in Sulu and Basilan provinces. The U.S. State Department’s Rewards for Justice Program, offered a five million dollar (US$) reward for his arrest and conviction in 2002. Marcelino was instrumental in the successful neutralization of Abu Sabaya, several Abu Sayyaf group commanders and members, including the successful rescue of the Dos Palmas kidnap victims.

Service as a junior officer 
Marcelino served with the Philippine Battalion Task Force to East Timor under the United Nations Transitional Administration in East Timor (UNTAET) in 2000. As a very young lieutenant, he served as the peacekeeping force commander in the sub-district of Natarbora, Manatuto, East Timor. He played a very vital role in the attainment of an environment of peace and security in his area of responsibility and the implementation of development programs of the other pillars of UNTAET. With his managerial expertise and unselfish desire to reach out to the Timorese people, despite many constraints and very limited resources, his unit had conducted medical and dental services, humanitarian aid, rehabilitation of school buildings, and repair of roads and bridges.

His good relationship with the different international agencies and non-governmental organizations in the area has established a cooperative effort for the development of the sub-district. In return, he was given several commendation letters from the civilian administration of East Timor, the UNTAET leadership and the UNTAET Peace Keeping Force Deputy Force Commander, Major General Mike Smith, of the Australian Defence Force.

He was a budding captain when he served as the Armed Forces of the Philippines (AFP) liaison officer to the Joint United States Military Assistance Group (JUSMAG) and the US Defense Representative to the Republic of the Philippines. As such, he was the primary point of contact and the responsible person to the Chief, JUSMAG-Philippines, and the concurrent Commander, US Pacific Command Representatives in matters concerning the AFP and the US Armed Forces. He likewise coordinated the Joint-Combined Bilateral Exercise Programs, the second-largest US International Military Education and Training (IMET) program in the world, as well as other military to military engagement programs as prescribed by the Mutual Defense Board. For this service, he was awarded by the Secretary of the United States Army with the US Army Achievement Medal for his invaluable contributions in strengthening the bilateral relations between the US and Philippine Armed Forces during crucial times of the US Operation Enduring Freedom-Philippines.

Anti-Drug Service 
Colonel Marcelino began his career in the Philippine Drug Enforcement Agency (PDEA) when he was directed to resolve the case of theft of 21-million pesos worth of shabu from PDEA’s Laboratory Service evidence room in August 2006. Then a seasoned intelligence officer in the Philippine Marine Corps, he was tasked by then PDEA Director General Dionisio Santiago to catch the perpetrators of the crime which put the agency in a very bad light. Going undercover, then Captain Marcelino led the operation at a shopping mall in Fairview, Quezon City which led to the arrest of the perpetrators of the theft and who were all PDEA officials and personnel. The arrests spearheaded the pursuit of cleansing the ranks of PDEA of drug users, coddlers, and protectors.

         In the early dawn of December 22, 2006, and barely four months in PDEA, Marcelino led a composite group of PDEA agents and Chinese authorities from China National Narcotics Control Commission (CNNCC) in steering the whole operations from intelligence work to the actual raid of the clandestine drug laboratory in Calumpit, Bulacan whereby they seized a 1.5 billion-peso (US$30.3 million) worth of methamphetamine hydrochloride. In so doing, his team then practically dismantled one of the biggest drug syndicates in Southeast Asia as cited by the CNNCC. Three members of the Chinese drug syndicate were also nabbed at Ninoy Aquino International Airport (NAIA) when they were about to leave the country. CNNCC also arrested 13 other members of the syndicate in China and recovered one ton of precursors. The operation significantly strengthened the cooperation between the Filipino and Chinese anti-narcotics agencies.

         Marcelino then became the youngest in the agency’s national directorial staff, who simultaneously held the positions of Director of PDEA’s International Cooperation and Foreign Affairs Service, Director of the Special Enforcement Service (PDEA’s national striking force trained to conduct special investigations and operations), the Director of the Interagency Counter-narcotics Operations Network or ICON (Philippine’s inter-agency effort against the organized trafficking of illegal drugs in the country), and as the Director for Intelligence of the Presidential Task Force Drug Courier (PTFDC). PTDFC was formed through Presidential Administrative Order 279, issued on February 8, 2010, due to the rampant incidents of Filipinos used as drug couriers by international drug cartels. It aims to help protect Filipinos from being victimized by the drug syndicates. As Director of the PDEA’s Special Enforcement Service and Director for Intelligence of PTDFC, Marcelino initiated and directed several operations to neutralize the West African Drug Syndicates (WADS) operating worldwide. WADS is an international drug trafficking organization primarily responsible for victimizing Asian nationals as drug mules. Most of its leaders and members are African nationals from Nigeria and neighboring countries. It operates worldwide using the promise of love, relationship, opportunity to travel, and high paying jobs and “easy money” to lure potential drug mules.

Awards and Recognition Marcelino's Anti-Drug Crusade 
With all his efforts, PDEA rose from being on the list of the most corrupt law enforcement agencies in the country, to being one of the top ten lease corrupt agencies in the Philippine government, according to Pulse Asia Review and the 2009 Global Competitiveness Survey Report, published in the World Economic Forum.

In 2009, Marcelino was chosen as the Most Outstanding Law Enforcer of the Year by the Volunteers Against Crime and Corruption (VACC) and was awarded PDEA’s Most Outstanding National Staff Officer for his exemplary achievement to the agency and to the people. He was given the Distinguished Public Servant Award by Rotary Club of Makati Urdaneta RD 3830 and was given a significant commendation by the Makati Business Club and other government and non-government institutions. He was also selected by the US Department of State to represent the Philippines in the International Visitor Leadership Program on US Foreign Policy and Counterterrorism in Washington, DC and different states in the continental United States.

Service as a Senior Officer 
In 2011, when the new leadership took over PDEA’s helm, Marcelino decided to go back to the Armed Forces of the Philippines, where he worked as the AFP Cell Liaison Officer to the Presidential Situation Room in Malacañang Palace and at the same time, Chief of the National Capital Region Command Operations Branch at the AFP Command Center. Significant international and national developments, during those times, prompted then Vice President and concurrent chair of the Interagency Council Against Trafficking, Jejomar Binay, to request the President for the reassignment of Marcelino to his office.

However, higher authorities opted to put him with the Intelligence Service Armed Forces of the Philippines (ISAFP) and work with the newly reactivated Presidential Anti-Organized Crime Commission (PAOCC). In PAOCC, Marcelino launched an operation that resulted in the arrest of hundreds of foreign nationals for violation of the Philippines Anti-Cybercrime Law. This operation is credited in the history of Philippine law enforcement as the largest number of single-day arrests against foreign nationals involved in criminal activities.

In 2012, ISAFP leadership installed Marcelino to the helm of military intelligence group to address the escalating threats posed by insurgency in the Southern Tagalog region wherein he also assumed the vice chairmanship of the Regional Intelligence Committee for more than two years. After substantially paralyzing the insurgents’ movements, Marcelino was once again tasked to work against drug trafficking organizations that have metamorphosed from a mere law enforcement problem into a national security concern.

It was during this time that significant counter-intelligence operations were launched. It has resulted in the discovery and dismantling of the clandestine shabu laboratory in Camiling, Tarlac in 2014. It was considered as the largest shabu laboratory ever dismantled in the history of Philippine narcotics operations, with a three billion pesos total worth of equipment and drugs seized during the raid. It also paved the way for the discovery and subsequent counteraction operations against high profile inmates in different penitentiaries who were running the drug trades behind bars.

The Betrayal and Birth of 'Free Marcelino Movement 
Early in 2016 and while serving as superintendent of the Philippine Navy Officers Candidate School, the entire nation was shocked when Marcelino, along with his Chinese confidential informant were framed and unlawfully arrested, after they were allegedly caught in a clandestine drug laboratory and maliciously accused of manufacturing illegal drugs. He was vilified in the media as upright law enforcer turned rogue. However, people from all walks of life came out to defend him. Peasants, religious leaders, indigenous people, military, and people from the academe mobilized and organized the Free Marcelino Movement, whose objective was to seek justice and freedom from the beleaguered marine officer. Marcelino's defense team believed that his arrest was meant to undermine the integrity and drug advocacy of the former drug enforcement official. He was incarcerated for almost a year, until the Department of Justice withdrew the criminal charges against him. The withdrawal of the case was affirmed by Manila Regional Trial Court Branch 49, saying that the case against him lacked merit. The 14th Philippine Congress, in its second regular session, adopted Senate Resolution 160, commending him and saying that “...Marcelino deserves the country’s recognition of his integrity, courage, and dedication to duty during these times, when the people’s trust in our law enforcers, once again, suffered a major setback”.

Achievements and Commendations 
Marcelino distinguished himself in combat, intelligence operations, and civil-military operations during his stay in Mindanao. As a true-blooded Marine, he was dauntless in facing the enemy. But, more than a warrior, Marcelino displayed a rare flair for winning the hearts and minds of civilians and military alike.

He was awarded by the Secretary of the United States Army with the US Army Achievement Medal for his invaluable contributions in strengthening the bilateral relations between the US and Philippine Armed Forces, during crucial times of the US Operation Enduring Freedom-Philippines. He was also a recipient of two Congressional Merit Medal, two Gold Cross Medal, which was the third from the highest award that a Filipino soldier can get for gallantry in combat, United Nations Service Medal, Bronze Cross Medal for risk of life and bravery, Military Merit Medals for meritorious achievement in combat, Silver Wing Medal, Disaster Relief and Rehabilitation Ribbon, Military Civic Action Medal, Mindanao-Sulu and Luzon Campaign Medals, Marine Command Badge, Presidential Unit Citation Badge, United States Navy Parachutist Badge, EOD and Psychological Operations Badges, Philippine Army Infantry Officer’s Badge and numerous letters of commendation and recognition from local government officials, senior military officers, and non-government organizations.

References

Living people
Filipino journalists
People from Bulacan
Philippine Navy personnel
Year of birth missing (living people)